Andronymus fontainei is a butterfly in the family Hesperiidae. It is found in the Democratic Republic of the Congo and is possibly endemic to the Albertine Rift.

References

Insects described in 2012
Erionotini